Matrona Dmitrievna Nikonova (1881/1885 – 2 May 1952) is a canonized saint of the Russian Orthodox Church who is said to have had the gifts of prophecy, spiritual vision, and healing from early childhood.

Early life
Matrona was born to Dmitry and Natalia Nikonov in the village of Sebino in Tula Province. She was the fourth child in the family. Her struggling parents planned to place her in an orphanage after her birth but her mother changed her mind after she had a dream, in which she saw that a white bird of divine beauty, with empty eye sockets, landed on her breast. When Matrona was born, she was blind, with eyelids closed over empty eye sockets. Her mother took this as a heavenly sign. According to legend, by the time she was eight, she had revealed prophetic and healing powers.

Revolution
Following the Russian Revolution of 1917, she and her friend Lydia Yankova became homeless peasants who left their villages to find work and food in larger cities. By 1925, Matrona moved to Moscow, possibly following her two brothers, and took to a life of wandering, finding shelter with friends and relatives in houses, apartments, and basements. She could not stay with her two brothers, both Communists, because Matrona preached the Russian Orthodox faith.

Later life
At a time when other religious people were sent to the Gulag or sent into exile for their beliefs, no one ever betrayed Matrona's location. People continued to come to Matrona for advice and for help with their troubles.

A story, related by her biographer, Zinaida Zhdanova, tells how Matrona told Zinaida's mother, Evdokia, described as a plain 28-year-old, that she would marry a handsome nobleman. Evdokia moved to Moscow and became a cook at the house of a rich nobleman whose son, Vladimir, was betrothed to one Shukhova. Shortly thereafter, Vladimir is said to have had a dream in which a voice told him to marry a woman named Evdokia. The next morning he asked if there was such a woman in the household, met her, and nearly fainted. Later, he was sent for training to Perm with Evdokia, and Zinaida was born shortly thereafter.

In another of her reported miracles, she helped a college architecture student revise a paper required for graduation by describing in detail some of the great architectural achievements in Florence and Rome, including the Palazzo Pitti.

She is said to have predicted her own death three days in advance, accepting all visitors during those final days. Following her death in 1952, her gravesite became a pilgrimage site. She was recently canonized by the Russian Orthodox Church. Her remains are now in the Church of the Protecting Veil of Our Lady at Intercession Convent in Moscow. The lines of people waiting to visit her gravesite is reported as regularly being quite long (often needing three or four hours to make a short visit to the gravesite) and well-behaved...

Veneration
Her day is commemorated by the Orthodox Church on May 2.

On February 15, 2018, the Holy Synod of the Romanian Patriarchate resolved that the Blessed Matrona of Moscow also be included in the Calendar of the Romanian Orthodox Church for veneration.<ref>Blessed Matrona of Moscow Included in Romanian Orthodox Church Calendar. PRAVMIR.COM. 26 APRIL 2018.</ref>

A monastery in honor of St. Matrona of Moscow is being built in Republika Srpska with the blessing of the Serbian Orthodox Church.

Further reading
 Zhadanova, Zinaida. The Life Story of the Blessed Elder Matryona, 1993.

Notes

References

SourcesThe Moscow Miracle Worker", by Polina Volidina, Aeroflot #6, 2006, retrieved February 26, 2007.

1885 births
1952 deaths
20th-century Christian saints
20th-century Christian mystics
Russian blind people
Eastern Orthodox mystics
Russian saints of the Eastern Orthodox Church
People from Kimovsky District
Holy Unmercenaries
Miracle workers
Christian female saints of the Late Modern era